In special economic zones  business and trades laws differ from the rest of the country. The term, and a number of other terms, can have different specific meanings in different countries and publications. Often they have relaxed jurisdiction of customs or related national regulations. They can be ports or other large areas or smaller allocated areas.

Terms include free port (porto Franco), free zone (zona franca), bonded area (US: foreign-trade zone), free economic zone, free-trade zone, export processing zone and maquiladora.

Most commonly a free port is a special customs area or small customs territory with generally less strict customs regulations (or no customs duties or controls for transshipment). Earlier in history, some free ports like Hong Kong enjoyed political autonomy. Many international airports have free ports, though they tend to be called customs areas, customs zones, or international zones.

Africa

Tanzania

Mtwara Freeport Zone

Libya

Misrata Free Zone

Liberia

Free Port of Monrovia

Egypt

Port Said
Suez Canal Container Terminal

Eritrea
Assab Free Port and International Airport
Massawa Free Port and International Airport

Morocco
 Atlantic Free Zone Kenitra
 Tangier Exportation Free Zone

Mauritius

The Mauritius Free Port

Nigeria

Although the enabling act came into effect in 1992, the pioneer Free Zone (the Calabar Free Trade Zone) was not fully completed until 1999, and commenced operation after official commissioning in November 2001. Since then, the Free Zones Scheme has been used as a vehicle for industrial and commercial development of the country. Private Sector participation and partnership with the Federal Government and other tiers of government has helped spread the scheme. This has culminated in the establishment of specialised Free Zones and other types of Zones, namely:

The introduction of free zones has played a large role in increasing the amount of investment into Nigeria. When all the free zones are fully operational, Nigeria is projected to play a large role in expanding export-driven manufacturing activities in Africa.

Asia

Bahrain

Manama

China
Guangzhou
Shanghai
Shenzhen
Tianjin
Xiamen
Zhuhai

Hong Kong

Central Ferry Piers, Victoria City
Container Terminal 9, Tsing Yi
Kai Tak Cruise Terminal, Kowloon
Kwai Tsing Container Terminals, Stonecutters Island
River Trade Terminal, Tuen Mun
Tsim Sha Tsui Ocean Terminal, Kowloon
Tsim Sha Tsui Ferry Pier, Kowloon
Tuen Mun Ferry Pier, Tuen Mun

Indonesia

Batam, Riau Islands

Iran
Anzali
Arvand Free Zone
Chabahar
Kish Island
KSEZ
PSEEZ
Qeshm

Israel

Eilat

Japan

Nagasaki
Niigata
Tokyo

Lebanon

Port of Beirut
Port of Tripoli (Lebanon)

Macau

Inner Harbour Ferry Terminal, Cotai West
Outer Harbour Ferry Terminal, Sé, Macau Peninsula
Taipa Ferry Terminal, Taipa East
Kai Ho Port, Coloane

Malaysia

Penang Until 1969
Langkawi

Mongolia
 Altanbulag Free Trade Zone
 Tsagaan Nuur Free Economic Zone
 Zamyn-Uud Free Economic Zone

Pakistan
Gwadar Gwadar Port

Philippines

Zamboanga City Special Economic Zone Authority

Singapore
Singapore

South Korea
Busan-Jinhae Free Economic Zone
Gwangyang Bay Area Free Economic Zone
Incheon Free Economic Zone
Ulsan Free Economic Zone
Gwangju Free Economic Zone
Daegu-Gyeongbuk Free Economic Zone
Chungbuk Free Economic Zone
East Coast Free Economic Zone

Taiwan
Port of Kaohsiung Free Trade Zone
Port of Keelung Free Trade Zone
Port of Taichung Free Trade Zone
Port of Taipei Free Trade Zone
Taoyuan Air Cargo Park Free Trade Zone

Thailand
Port of Bangkok
Port of Chiang Kong
Port of Chieng Saen
Port of Laem Chabang
Port of Ranong

Turkey

United Arab Emirates

Uzbekistan
 Nukus FEZ

Europe

Albania
 Koplik (Albanian Alps)
 Spitalle  (Port of Durres)

Austria
(Member of the European Union)

Linz (port on river Danube)
Vienna (port on river Danube)

Belarus

Brest FEZ
Grodno FEZ
Mogilev Free Enterprise Zone

Croatia
(Member of the European Union)

Danube free zone of Vukovar
Free zone of Kukuljanovo
Free zone of Port of Rijeka - Škrljevo
Free zone of Osijek
Free zone of Zagreb
Free zone of Krapina-Zagorje
Free zone of Split-Dalmatia
Free zone of Port of Ploče
Free zone of Port of Pula
Free zone of Port of Rijeka
Free zone of Port of Split

Denmark
(Member of the European Union)

 Freeport of Copenhagen (Københavns Frihavn), Copenhagen

Finland
(Member of the European Union)

Free zone of Lappeenranta (Lappeenrannan Vapaa-alue)
Freeport of Hanko (Hangon Vapaasatama)

France
(Member of the European Union)

Free Zone of Le Verdon - Port de Bordeaux (Zone franche du Verdon — Port de Bordeaux)

Germany

(Member of the European Union)
Freeport of Bremerhaven (Freihafen Bremerhaven)
Freeport of Cuxhaven (Freihafen Cuxhaven), since 1896
Freeport of Deggendorf (Freihafen Deggendorf), since 1989
Freeport of Duisburg (Freihafen Duisburg), since 1989
Speicherstadt, Hamburg

Georgia

Adjara autonomous republic
Batumi, 1878-1886 (then Russia)

Gibraltar
(Part of the United Kingdom)

Port of Gibraltar

Greece
(Member of the European Union)

Free zone of Evros (Debzos)
Free zone of Heraklion
Free zone of Piraeus
Free zone of Thessaloniki

Ireland
(Member of the European Union)

Port of Cork Free Port
Shannon Free Zone (1959 - 2003)

Isle of Man

Isle of Man Airport (Ballasala)

Italy
(Member of the European Union)
Aosta Valley
Campione d'Italia
Livigno
Livorno, 1675–1860
Port of Trieste
Free Zone of Venice (Porto franco di Venezia)

Latvia
(Member of the European Union)

Free port of Riga
Free port of Ventspils
Rezekne SEZ
Latgale SEZ
Liepaja SEZ

Lithuania
(Member of the European Union)

Akmenė Free Economic Zone
Kaunas Free Economic Zone
Kėdainiai Free Economic Zone
Klaipėda Free Economic Zone
Marijampolė Free Economic Zone
Panevėžys Free Economic Zone
Šiauliai Free Economic Zone

Luxembourg
(Member of the European Union)

Luxembourg Freeport

Malta

(Member of the European Union)
Malta Freeport

Moldova 
Giurgiulești Freeport

Monaco 
Monaco Freeport

Portugal

(Member of the European Union)
The Free Trade Zone of Madeira, which is composed by the following tax benefits 
Industrial Free Zone of Caniçal
International Business Centre of Madeira
International Ship Registry of Madeira

Romania

(Member of the European Union)
Port of Constanţa, January 2007

Russia

Nakhodka
Vladivostok, 1861–1909, 2015 (Free port of Vladivostok)

Serbia
Serbia has 14 free economic zones as of September 2017; these are:
 Free Zone Apatin
 Free Zone FAS-Kragujevac
 Free Zone Kruševac
 Free Zone Niš-South
 Free Zone Novi Sad
 Free Zone Pirot
 Free Zone Priboj
 Free Zone Šabac
 Free Zone Smederevo
 Free Zone Subotica
 Free Zone Svilajnac
 Free Zone Užice
 Free Zone Vranje
 Free Zone Zrenjanin

Spain

(Member of the European Union)
Free zone of Cádiz (Zona franca de Cádiz)
Free zone of Vigo (Zona franca de Vigo)
Free zone of Las Palmas de Gran Canaria (Zona franca de Las Palmas de Gran Canaria)
Free zone of Santa Cruz de Tenerife (Zona franca de Tenerife)
(Ceuta and Melilla are not Free Ports or Free zones because they are part of Spain, but not part of the European union for customs and excises)

Sweden

(Member of the European Union)
Marstrand Free Port, 18th century
Saint-Barthélemy, 1785–1878
Stockholms frihamn, 1919–1995
Frihamnen, Göteborg, 1922-

Switzerland

Geneva Freeport, La Praille, Geneva
Geneva Cointrin International Airport free port, Geneva
Magazzini Generali con Punto Franco SA, Chiasso and Stabio, free port and bonded warehouse, Chiasso
PESA - Port-Franc et Entrepôts de Lausanne-Chavornay SA, free port and bonded warehouse, Chavornay (Vaud)
SEV - Société des Entrepôts Vevey SA, free port and bonded warehouse, Vevey

Cyprus

(Member of the European Union)
Limassol Free Zone
Larnaca Free Zone

Ukraine

Free port and free economic zone Odessa
1819-1858
Trade sea port of Odessa, January 1, 2000 for 25 years

United Kingdom

Liverpool Free Zone
Prestwick Airport Free Zone
Southampton Free Zone
Tilbury Free Zone
Port of Sheerness Free Zone
Teesside Free Zone

The Americas

Argentina

Zona Franca La Plata
Polo Industrial Zona Franca General Pico, La Pampa

The Bahamas

Freeport, Grand Bahama

Bermuda

Free port of Hamilton Harbour, Hamilton, Bermuda

Brazil

Zona Franca de Manaus

Canada

Foreign trade zones:
Calgary Region Inland Port
Cape Breton Regional Municipality
CentrePort Canada
Global Transportation Hub Authority
Halifax Gateway
Port Alberta
Quebec City
Niagara
Windsor–Essex
Calgary Region Inland Port - FTZ Point

Chile

Iquique
Punta Arenas

Colombia
San Andrés
Zona Franca
Zona Franca de Bogota
Zona Franca del Pacifico
Zona Franca Palermo

Dominican Republic

Mega Port of Punta Caucedo

Jamaica

Montego Bay

Panama

Colón Free Trade Zone

Costa Rica

Zona Franca Saret
Zona Franca Coyol
CF Free Zone Park S.R.L
Zona Franca Metropolitana
Zona Franca del Este
Concentrix Free Trade Zone, S.A

Uruguay

Carrasco International Airport (Free Airport)
Zona Franca Colonia
Zona Franca de Montevideo
 Puerto de Montevideo (Free Port)
Zona Franca Rivera

United States

United States Virgin Islands

Venezuela

Free port of Isla Margarita (Puerto Libre de Margarita)
Free zone of the Paraguaná Peninsula (Zona Franca de la Península de Paraguaná)
Free zone of Santa Elena de Uairén (Zona Franca de Santa Elena de Uairén)

See also
 Bonded warehouse
 Bonded logistics park
 Duty-free shop
 List of duty-free shops
 Entrepôt
 Free-trade area

References

Freight transport
International taxation